Mandarich Massif is a rugged Y-shaped massif which rises to  on the south side of Byrd Glacier in Antarctica. It stands between Brecher Glacier and Twombley Glacier, two southern tributaries to Byrd Glacier. The massif was named by the Advisory Committee on Antarctic Names after Captain (later Rear Admiral) Stevan Mandarich (1911–2001), U.S. Navy, Chief of Staff to Rear Admiral Richard E. Byrd on Operation Deep Freeze I, 1955–56.

References

Mountains of Oates Land